Vermont was admitted at the end of the First Congress, with the admission taking effect at the start of the Second Congress. Vermont was entitled to elect two representatives. Vermont law at the time required a majority to win an office.

See also 
 United States House of Representatives elections, 1790 and 1791
 List of United States representatives from Vermont

References 

Vermont
1791
United States House of Representatives